A mathematical joke is a form of humor which relies on aspects of mathematics or a stereotype of mathematicians. The humor may come from a pun, or from a double meaning of a mathematical term, or from a lay person's misunderstanding of a mathematical concept. Mathematician and author John Allen Paulos in his book Mathematics and Humor described several ways that mathematics, generally considered a dry, formal activity, overlaps with humor, a loose, irreverent activity: both are forms of "intellectual play"; both have "logic, pattern, rules, structure"; and both are "economical and explicit".

Some performers combine mathematics and jokes to entertain and/or teach math.

Humor of mathematicians may be classified into the esoteric and exoteric categories. Esoteric jokes rely on the intrinsic knowledge of mathematics and its terminology. Exoteric jokes are intelligible to the outsiders, and most of them compare mathematicians with representatives of other disciplines or with common folk.

Pun-based jokes

Some jokes use a mathematical term with a second non-technical meaning as the punchline of a joke.

Occasionally, multiple mathematical puns appear in the same jest:

This invokes four double meanings: adder (snake) vs. addition (algebraic operation);  multiplication (biological reproduction) vs. multiplication (algebraic operation); log (a cut tree trunk) vs. log (logarithm); and table (set of facts) vs. table (piece of furniture).

Other jokes create a double meaning from a direct calculation involving facetious variable names, such as this retold from Gravity's Rainbow:

The first part of this joke relies on the fact that the primitive (formed when finding the antiderivative) of the function 1/x is log(x). The second part is then based on the fact that the antiderivative is actually a class of functions, requiring the inclusion of a constant of integration, usually denoted as C—something which calculus students may forget. Thus, the indefinite integral of 1/cabin is "log(cabin) + C", or "A log cabin plus the sea", i.e., "A houseboat".

Jokes with numeral bases
Some jokes depend on ambiguity of numeral bases. 

This joke subverts the trope of phrases that begin with "there are two types of people in the world..." and relies on an ambiguous meaning of the expression 10, which in the binary numeral system is equal to the decimal number 2. There are many alternative versions of the joke, such as "There are two types of people in this world. Those who can extrapolate from incomplete information."

Another pun using different radices, asks:

The play on words lies in the similarity of the abbreviation for October/Octal and December/Decimal, and the coincidence that both equal the same amount.

Imaginary numbers

Some jokes are based on imaginary number , treating it as if it is a real number. A telephone intercept message of "you have dialed an imaginary number, please rotate your handset ninety degrees and try again" is a typical example. Another popular example is:
"What did  say to ?
Get real.
What did  say to ?
Be rational."

Stereotypes of mathematicians
Some jokes are based on stereotypes of mathematicians tending to think in complicated, abstract terms, causing them to lose touch with the "real world". These compare mathematicians to physicists, engineers, or the "soft" sciences in a form similar to an Englishman, an Irishman and a Scotsman, showing the other scientists doing something practical, while the mathematician proposes a theoretically valid but physically nonsensical solution.

Mathematicians are also shown as averse to making hasty generalizations from a small amount of data, even if some form of generalization seems plausible:

A classic joke involving stereotypes is the "Dictionary of Definitions of Terms Commonly Used in Math Lectures". Examples include "Trivial: If I have to show you how to do this, you're in the wrong class" and "Similarly: At least one line of the proof of this case is the same as before."

Non-mathematician's math
This category of jokes comprises those that exploit common misunderstandings of mathematics, or the expectation that most people have only a basic mathematical education, if any.

The joke is that the employee fails to understand the scientist's implication of the uncertainty in the age of the fossil and uses false precision.

Mock  mathematics
A form of mathematical humor comes from using mathematical tools (both abstract symbols and physical objects such as calculators) in various ways which transgress their intended scope.  These constructions are generally devoid of any substantial mathematical content, besides some basic arithmetic.

Mock mathematical reasoning
A set of jokes applies mathematical reasoning to situations where it is not entirely valid. Many are based on a combination of well-known quotes and basic logical constructs such as syllogisms:

Another set of jokes relates to the absence of mathematical reasoning, or misinterpretation of conventional notation:

That is, the limit as x goes to 8 from above is a sideways 8 or the infinity sign, in the same way that the limit as x goes to three from above is a sideways 3 or the Greek letter omega (conventionally used to notate the smallest infinite ordinal number).

An anomalous cancellation is a kind of arithmetic procedural error that gives a numerically correct answer:

Mathematical fallacies
A number of mathematical fallacies are part of mathematical humorous folklore. For example:

This appears to prove that , but uses division by zero to produce the result.

Some jokes attempt a seemingly plausible, but in fact impossible, mathematical operation.  For example:

Pi goes on and on and on ...
And e is just as cursed.
I wonder: Which is larger
When their digits are reversed?

To reverse the digits of a number's decimal expansion, we have to start at the last digit and work backwards.

Humorous numbers
Many numbers have been given humorous names, either as pure numbers or as units of measurement. Some examples:

Sagan has been defined as "billions and billions", a metric of the number of stars in the observable universe.

The number 42 appears prominently in the Douglas Adams trilogy The Hitchhiker's Guide to the Galaxy, where it is portrayed as "the answer to the ultimate question of life, the universe and everything". This number appears as a fixed value in the TIFF image file format and its derivatives (including for example the ISO standard TIFF/EP) where the content of bytes 2–3 is defined as 42: "An arbitrary but carefully chosen number that further identifies the file as a TIFF file".

The number 69 is commonly used in reference to a group of sex positions in which two people align to perform oral sex, thus becoming mutually inverted like the numerals 6 and 9. Because of this association, "69" has become an internet meme and is known as "the sex number" in certain communities.

Calculator spelling

Calculator spelling is the formation of words and phrases by displaying a number and turning the calculator upside down. The jest may be formulated as a mathematical problem where the result, when read upside down, appears to be an identifiable phrase like "ShELL OIL" or "Esso" using seven-segment display character representations where the open-top "4" is an inverted 'h' and '5' looks like 'S'. Other letters can be used as numbers too with 8 and 9 representing B and G, respectively. 

An attributed example of calculator spelling, which dates from the 1970s, is 5318008, which when turned over spells "BOOBIES".

Limericks
A mathematical limerick is an expression which, when read aloud, matches the form of a limerick. The following example is attributed to Leigh Mercer:

This is read as follows:

Another example using calculus is:

which may be read:

The limerick is true if  is interpreted as the natural logarithm.

Doughnut and coffee mug topology joke

An oft-repeated joke is that topologists cannot tell a coffee cup from a doughnut, since they are topologically equivalent: a sufficiently pliable doughnut could be reshaped (by a homeomorphism) to the form of a cup by creating a dimple and progressively enlarging it, while shrinking the hole into a handle.

See also
 New Math (song)
 Spherical cow
 All horses are the same color

Notes

References

External links
 Mathematical Humor – from Mathworld
 
 13 Jokes That Every Math Geek Will Find Hilarious

In-jokes